Jindřichov (also known as Jindřichov ve Slezsku) is a municipality and village in Bruntál District in the Moravian-Silesian Region of the Czech Republic. It has about 1,200 inhabitants.

Administrative parts
The village of Arnultovice is an administrative part of Jindřichov.

Geography
It is situated in the Osoblažsko microregion, on the border with Poland.

Jindřichov is located in the valley of the Osoblaha River in the Zlatohorská Highlands.

History

The first written mention of Jindřichov is from 1256. The village was founded shortly before by the Olomouc bishop Bruno von Schauenburg, during the German colonization of the region.

The most notable owners of Jindřichov were the Counts of Hodice, who had built here the castle and the church. The village was in their possession from the mid-17th century until 1739.

Transport
Jindřichov lies on the Krnov–Głuchołazy–Jeseník railway line.

Sights

The landmark of Jindřichov is Jindřichov Castle with a large park. The castle was built in the Baroque style in the second half of the 17th century, as a seat for the Counts of Hodice. The castle was rebuilt in the Empire style in 1844, after it was damaged by a fire. Since 2010, the castle has been owned by Jindřichov. Today it serves as housing for the socially disadvantaged and as a multi-purpose cultural facility.

The castle is surrounded by a  large park. It was founded by the Counts of Hodice in the French style in the first half of the 17th century, was adapted to the English-style park in the first half of the 19th century. There is a great variety of rare trees. The park is decorated with several sculptures, the oldest are two marble lions in front of the castle entrance from the 18th century, There is also a fountain and statues of St. Hubert, St. Christopher and Friedrich Schiller.

The second landmark is the Church of Saint Nicholas, built in 1671–1673. Valuable is also a sculptural group  of the Virgin Mary near the castle entrance, which dates from 1757.

Twin towns – sister cities

Jindřichov is twinned with:
 Hennersdorf, Austria

References

External links

Villages in Bruntál District